Truth seeker(s) may refer to:

 Truth seeker (term), a term used by conspiracy theorists to describe themselves
 Truth Seekers, a 2020 British TV series
The Truth Seeker, an American periodical
 The Truth Seekers, a 2016 Singaporean TV series